Below is a table of online music databases that are largely free of charge.  Many of the sites provide a specialized service or focus on a particular music genre.  Some of these operate as an online music store or purchase referral service in some capacity. Among the sites that have information on the largest number of entities are those sites that focus on discographies of composing and performing artists.

Performance rights organisations (PRO) typically have their own databases as per country they represent, in accordance with CISAC, to help domestic artists collect royalties.  Information available on these portals include songwriting credits, publishing percentage splits, and alternate titles for different distribution channels. It is one of the most accurate and official type of databases because it involves direct communication between the artists, record labels, distributors, legal teams, publishers and a global governing body regulating PRO's. Many countries that observe copyright have an organisation established, currently there are 119 CISAC members, and they may be not-for-profit. The databases are typically known as 'repertory searches' or 'searching works' and may require an account while others are open to view for free as public including the USA's ASCAP Songview and Ace  services, Canada's SOCAN, South Korea's KOMCA, France's SACEM, and Israel's ACUM.

General databases

Music genre specific

Specialized areas

Printed music (sheets) databases

Metadata providers and distributors

Non-functioning databases

See also

Automatic content recognition
Comparison of digital music stores
List of music sharing websites
Comparison of music streaming services
Comparison of online music lockers
List of music software
List of Internet radio stations
List of online digital musical document libraries
Streaming media
Virtual Library of Musicology

References 

 
Music
Databases